Bobby Vinton is a nine-track collection of previously recorded songs by Bobby Vinton, released in 1978. It contains two singles and seven album tracks, all randomly picked and recorded for ABC Records.

Track listing

Side one

Side two

Album credits
By arrangement with ABC Records
Remastering engineer: Jack Daly
Cover art: Brian Thompson

References

Bobby Vinton (1978 album)
Bobby Vinton compilation albums